Reggie Oliver may refer to:
 Reggie Oliver (American football)
 Reggie Oliver (writer)